The Cathedral Range (Taungurung: Nanadhong) is a mountain range that is part of the Great Dividing Range in Victoria, Australia, located in Cathedral Range State Park. The range is formed from a  ridge of upturned sedimentary rock, consisting mainly of sandstone, mudstone and conglomerates of the Devonian Period. This has given the range steep sides, and a narrow razorback ridge. The higher plateau on the eastern boundary of the park includes  the nearby Lake Mountain cross country ski area. Much of the park and adjoining forests stills shows the damage from the Black Saturday bushfires in 2009.

The Taungurung name for the area encompassing the Cathedral Range State Park is Nanadhong.

See also 

 List of mountains in Victoria

References

External links
 Parks Victoria: Cathedral Range State Park

Great Dividing Range